Irving Charles Velson (June 3, 1913 - 1976) was an American who had a long career in the Communist Party of the United States (CPUSA) secret apparatus and who allegedly worked for Soviet Military Intelligence (GRU).  He was the son of Clara Lemlich Shavelson and changed his name to Velson by 1938.  Velson worked as a machinist at the Brooklyn Navy Yard from 1931 to 1938.

According to Congressional investigators, Velson worked closely with J. Peters, head of the CPUSA's secret apparatus, and supported Cpl. Robert Osman in espionage activities on behalf of the GRU in the Panama Canal Zone. Robert Gladnick, a former CPUSA functionary and a member of the Lincoln Brigade supported this version.  Gladnick stated that Bernard Schuster (aka Bernard Chester) then director of the CPUSA's antimilitarist operations, was replaced in the mid-1930s by Velson, in a program to develop secret Communist groups among American military personnel.  Venona decrypts show Velson reporting on weapons technology and other agent handling tasks.  

Velson's code name with the GRU, and as deciphered by the Venona project is "Nick".

Venona
Velson is referenced in the following Venona decryptions:

1324 GRU New York to Moscow, 11 August 1943; 
1456 GRU New York to Moscow, 8 September 1943.

References
 Testimony of Charles I. Velson, 26 September 1951, Unauthorized Travel of Subversives Behind the Iron Curtain on United States Passports, U.S. Congress, Subcommittee to Investigate the Administration of the Internal Security Act, Senate Judiciary Committee, 207–217
 Testimony of Charles I. Velson, 6 May 1953, Investigation of Communist Activities in the New York City Area, U.S. House of Representatives Committee on Un-American Activities.  Mr. Velson testified that he was 39 years old at that time, hence, born in 1913 or 1914.
 Robert Gladnick, I Was a Fifth Columnist, Gladnick folder, Isaac Don Levine papers, Emory University Library, Atlanta, Ga.
The Political Graveyard
 John Earl Haynes and Harvey Klehr, Venona: Decoding Soviet Espionage in America, Yale University Press (1999), pgs. 185-186, 369, 466.
 New York Red Book 1939 lists him as a 1938 candidate for the New York State Senate, 11th District, under the name Velson, not Shavelson.
 "Short biographies of candidates who will be voted upon here Tuesday," New York Times, November 5, 1938, gives Velson's date of birth as June 3, 1913.

1913 births
1976 deaths
American communists
American people in the Venona papers
American spies for the Soviet Union
Espionage in the United States